Eel Glacier is located to the north of Mount Anderson and east of West Peak, in Olympic National Park in the U.S. state of Washington. Meltwater from the glacier gives rise to Silt Creek, which flows through the  Olympic Mountains and Olympic National Park. Between 1920 and 2009, Eel Glacier has retreated significantly, losing 50 percent of its surface area.

See also
List of glaciers in the United States

References

Glaciers of the Olympic Mountains
Glaciers of Jefferson County, Washington
Glaciers of Washington (state)